The 2006 Swedish Short Course Swimming Championships took place in Fyrishov, Uppsala on 23–26 November 2006. 44 champions were declared and three national records, eight national junior records, 16 championship records, and seven national club relay records were set.

Medal table

Medalists
NR denotes National Record
CR denotes Championship Record

Men's

|-
|50 m freestyle

|-
|100 m freestyle

|-
|200 m freestyle

|-
|400 m freestyle

|-
|1500 m freestyle

|-
|50 m backstroke

|-
|100 m backstroke

|-
|200 m backstroke

|-
|50 m breaststroke

|-
|100 m breaststroke

|-
|200 m breaststroke

|-
|50 m butterfly

|-
|100 m butterfly

|-
|200 m butterfly

|-
|100 m individual medley

|-
|200 m individual medley

|-
|400 m individual medley

|- valign=top
|4 × 50 m freestyle relay

|- valign=top
|4 × 100 m freestyle relay

|- valign=top
|4 × 200 m freestyle relay

|- valign=top
|4 × 50 m medley relay

|- valign=top
|4 × 100 m medley relay

|}

Women's

|-
|50 m freestyle

|-
|100 m freestyle

|-
|200 m freestyle

|-
|400 m freestyle

|-
|800 m freestyle

|-
|50 m backstroke

|-
|100 m backstroke

|-
|200 m backstroke

|-
|50 m breaststroke

|-
|100 m breaststroke

|-
|200 m breaststroke

|-
|50 m butterfly

|-
|100 m butterfly

|-
|200 m butterfly

|-
|100 m individual medley

|-
|200 m individual medley

|-
|400 m individual medley

|- valign=top
|4 × 50 m freestyle relay

|- valign=top
|4 × 100 m freestyle relay

|- valign=top
|4 × 200 m freestyle relay

|- valign=top
|4 × 50 m medley relay

|- valign=top
|4 × 100 m medley relay

|}

References 

Swedish Short Course Swimming Championships
Swimming Championships
Swedish Short Course Swimming Championships
Sports competitions in Uppsala
November 2006 sports events in Europe